Kstati Russian-American Newspaper or Apropos-Kstati, is a weekly Russian-language newspaper published in the San Francisco Bay Area. The editors are Nikolay Sundeyev and Janna Sundeyeva. It was created in 1994 and has a circulation of 9,000.

References

External links
 Official website

Publications established in 1994
1994 establishments in California
Newspapers published in the San Francisco Bay Area
Non-English-language newspapers published in California
Russian-American culture in California
Russian-language newspapers published in the United States
Weekly newspapers published in California